Flabellina confusa is a species of sea slug, an aeolid nudibranch, a marine gastropod mollusc in the family Flabellinidae. It is now known to be a synonym of Calmella gaditana.

Distribution
This species was described from the Bay of Arcachon, France, Atlantic Ocean.

References

Flabellinidae
Gastropods described in 2008